Lagrange or La Grange may refer to:

Mathematics and physics
 Lagrange multiplier, a mathematical technique
 Lagrange's theorem (group theory), or Lagrange's lemma, an important result in Group theory
 Lagrange's theorem (number theory), about prime numbers
 Lagrangian point, in physics and astronomy
 Lagrange polynomial
 Lagrangian mechanics

Places

Australia
 Lagrange Bay, Western Australia
 La Grange (originally La Grange Mission), a dual name for Bidyadanga Community, Western Australia

France
 La Grange, Doubs
 Lagrange, Hautes-Pyrénées
 Lagrange, Landes
 Lagrange, Territoire de Belfort

United States
 LaGrange, Arkansas 
 La Grange, California
 La Grange (Glasgow, Delaware)
 LaGrange, Georgia
 LaGrange Commercial Historic District, in the National Register of Historic Places listings in Troup County, Georgia
 La Grange, Illinois, village in Cook County
 La Grange Village Historic District, in the National Register of Historic Places listings in Cook County, Illinois
 LaGrange, Indiana
 LaGrange, Tippecanoe County, Indiana
 La Grange, Kentucky
 Lagrange, Maine
 La Grange (La Plata, Maryland)
 LaGrange (Cambridge, Maryland)
 La Grange, Missouri
 LaGrange, New York
 La Grange, North Carolina
 La Grange Historic District (North Carolina)
 LaGrange (Harris Crossroads, North Carolina)
 LaGrange, Ohio
 La Grange, Tennessee
 La Grange, Texas, a county seat
 Lagrange, Virginia
 La Grange, Monroe County, Wisconsin, a town
 La Grange, Walworth County, Wisconsin, a town
 La Grange (community), Wisconsin, an unincorporated community
 La Grange, Wyoming, a town
 LaGrange County, Indiana
 Lagrange Township, Bond County, Illinois
 LaGrange Township, Michigan
 LaGrange Township, Lorain County, Ohio
 La Grange, U.S. Virgin Islands

Moon
 Lagrange (crater)

Other uses
Lagrange (surname)
 Lagrange: The Flower of Rin-ne, a 2011 mecha anime
 La Grange expedition, Australia
 "La Grange" (song), released on the 1973 ZZ Top album Tres Hombres
 Château Lagrange, a wine from Bordeaux, France

See also
 Fond La Grange, Haiti
 Château de la Grange-Bléneau, a castle in France
 Lagrangian (disambiguation)
 Grange (disambiguation)
 La Grange Historic District (disambiguation)